Manjari (born 17 April 1986) is an Indian playback singer and Hindustani vocalist. Her first stage performance was with Shiva, the Kolkata - based rock band, when she was in class eight.

Career

Manjari was introduced into the world of film music by Ilaiyaraaja in the Sathyan Anthikad movie, 'Achuvinte Amma'. She sang two songs in the movie, a duet 'Swasathin Thalam' with Dr. K.J. Yesudas and a solo 'Tamarakuruvikku' in the movie. Since her début, she has worked with the likes of Ramesh Narayan, Ilayaraaja, M. G. Radhakrishnan, Kaithapram Viswanathan, Vidyasagar, M. Jayachandran, Ouseppachan, Mohan Sithara and the late Raveendran Master and Johnson Master. She has also sung for albums such as Balabhaskar's Mazhayil Aaro Oral. She has over 300+ Malayalam, Tamil and Telugu films and several albums to her credit.
Since 2004, Manjari has performed Hindustani Classical concerts in India and the world over under the banner of "Soorya". Manjari also gained popularity as a Ghazal singer. She performed an exclusive Ghazal show titled 'Khayal' in 'Media One TV' featuring popular Ghazals of yesteryears.

Manjari won the Kerala State Film Award for the best female singer twice; first in 2004, for the song Mukilin makale in the film Makalku and second in 2008 for the song Mullulla Murikkinmel in Vilapangalkappuram.
Manjari is a playback singer and Live performer. She has set up her own band for Ghazal Concerts and performs at various venues in India and abroad. Manjari continues to pursue her studies in Hindustani Classical Music under the tutelage of Pandit Ramesh Julé of Kirana Gharana.

In 2016 she won the Sahir and Adeeb International Award for her contribution to Urdu and the genre of ghazals. Among the four recipients, she was the only Indian to receive the award in 2016. She is also the youngest Indian to receive the award. In the past Adeeb International has awarded the Sahir and Adeeb awards to almost 60 eminent personalities and legends like Gulzar, Javed Akhtar, Kaifi Azmi, B R Chopra, Shabana Azmi, Sharmila Tagore, Begum Bushra Rehman amongst others.

Personal life 

Manjari was born to Babu Rajendran and Dr. Latha; she also has a younger sister named Madhuri. She is an alumnus of Indian School, Al Wadi Al Kabir in the Sultanate of Oman. 

Manjari is married to her childhood friend Jerin.

Discography

Films

Singles

In 2014, Manjari released her first Hindi Single titled 'Aiy Aiy Yaa' with Crescendo Music. The Lyrics of Alok Jha is composed by Santosh Nair. The video was shot in exotic locations of Dubai.

In 2015, Manjari released a Malayalam single titled 'Anuragam' which was composed and sung by the artist. She also featured in the video shot in Munnar under the direction of VK Prakash.

She has also sung title songs for several Malayalam television series like Swami Ayyapan, Ente Manasaputhri, Krishnakripasagaram, Jalam and Sreekrishnaleela.

Manjari released her very first original Ghazal titled “Ab Etbaar Nahi” on 22 September 2020. This musical which is her own composition penned by Moid Rasheedi, won millions of hearts within the first day of release.

 Television
Smart singer as Judge
Pathinalam ravu as Judge 
Khayal as Host
Surya super singer as Judge
Star Singer season 8 as Judge

 Appeared Films
 Positive 2008
 Rock Star 2015
 Varthamanam 2019

 Appeared TV Serials
 Aa Amma

Awards
Kerala State Film Awards:
 2004 – Best Playback Singer – Makalkku ('Mukilin Makale')
 2008 – Best Playback Singer – Vilapangalkappuram ('Mullulla Murikkinmel')

Asianet Film Awards:
 2006 – Best Female Playback – Rasathanthram ('Attinkara')

Mathrubhumi Film Awards:
 2006 – Best Female Playback – Karuthapakshikal ('Mazhayil Ratrimazhayil')
 2012 – Mathrubhumi Film Awards – Popular Singer of the Year -Urumi ('Chinni Chinni')

Kerala Film Critics Association Awards:
 2012– Best Playback Singer (Female) -Urumi ('Chinni Chinni')
 2019– Best Playback Singer (Female) -March Randam Vyazham ('Tharapadham paadum')

Film Awards:
 2012 – Vanitha Film Awards – Best Female Playback -Urumi ('Chinni Chinni')
 2012 – Ramu Kariat Film Awards – Best Female Playback- Urumi ('Chinni Chinni')
 2012 – Surya/Film Producers Awards- Best Female Playback – Urumi ('Chinni Chinni')
 2012 – Amrita Film Awards- Best Female Playback – Urumi ('Chinni Chinni')
 2012 – Jaihind Film Awards- Best Female Playback – Urumi ('Chinni Chinni')
 2012 – Kerala Film Critics Award- Best Female Playback
 Nominated : 2009 – Filmfare Award for Best Female Playback for "Kadaloram Vatsa" from Minnaminnikoottam
 Nominated : 2011 – Filmfare Award for Best Female Playback for "Chimmi Chimmi" from Urumi

Sahir and Adeeb International Award:
 2016 – Sahir and Adeeb International Award for her contribution to Urdu language and ghazals

References

External links

Interview: Manjari on a winning note
Complete Listing of Manjari's songs for Malayalam Movies
Interview: Manjari Songs from the Heart

1986 births
Kerala State Film Award winners
Tamil playback singers
Indian women playback singers
Singers from Thiruvananthapuram
Living people
Malayalam playback singers
21st-century Indian singers
Film musicians from Kerala
Hindustani singers
Indian women classical singers
Women Hindustani musicians
21st-century Indian women singers
Indian expatriates in Oman
Women musicians from Kerala
Actresses in Malayalam television
Actresses in Malayalam cinema